Bithell is a surname. Notable people with the surname include:

 Bert Bithell (1900–1969), English footballer
 Brian Bithell (born 1956), English footballer
 Mike Bithell (born 1985), British video game developer
 Richard Bithell (1821–1902), English agnostic philosopher and writer
 Stuart Bithell (born 1986), British sailor